The monarchs of Haiti were the heads of state and rulers of Haiti on three non-consecutive occasions in the 19th century.

With complete independence achieved from France in 1804, Haiti became an independent monarchy—the First Empire of Haiti (1804–1806). Haiti reverted to a monarchy in the 1810s, during the Kingdom of Haiti (1811–1820). Haiti reverted for a third and final time to a monarchy during the Second Empire of Haiti (1849–1859).

The period known as the Duvalier dynasty (1957–1986), despite the misleading name, is not a period of monarchy but of an authoritarian family dictatorship.

First Empire of Haiti (1804–1806)

Kingdom of Haiti (1811–1820)

Second Empire of Haiti (1849–1859)

Kingdom of La Gonâve

Timeline

See also 

 List of heads of state of Haiti
 List of Haitian royal consorts
 Crown of Faustin I

Notes

References 

Haiti
Monarchs